This is a list of programming for  Vice channels in the US, and in the UK. Also included are series which aired on the international Viceland channels.

Current programming

Original series

Original limited series
Sex Before The Internet (January 10, 2023 – February 28, 2023)

Acquired programming
Intervention (2017–present)
Hoarders (2018–present)
Ice Road Truckers (2019–present)
Shipping Wars (2019–present)
American Restoration (2019–present)
Top Gear (2019–present)
Killer Kids (2020–present)
Unsolved Mysteries (2020–present)
I Survived... (2020-present)
MLW on Vice (2021–present)
High Stakes Poker (2021–present)
Storage Wars (2022-present)
Nightwatch (2022-present)
Ghost Hunters (2022-present)

Former programming

Original series
Balls Deep (February 29 – December 29, 2016)
Gaycation (February 29, 2016 - April 30, 2017)
Noisey (February 29, 2016 - February 14, 2017)
Vice Essentials (February 29 – December 29, 2016)
Vice's Guide to Film (February 29, 2016 - January 21, 2018)
Weediquette (February 29, 2016 - November 14, 2017)
1-800 LEAVE A CALL (February 29, 2016)
Bar Talk (February 29, 2016)
Flophouse (February 29, 2016 – April 29, 2016)
Vice Lab (February 29, 2016 – March 17, 2016)
Fuck, That's Delicious (March 3, 2016 - July 20, 2020)
States of Undress (March 30, 2016 - August 1, 2017)
Traveling the Stars: Action Bronson and Friends Watch Ancient Aliens (April 20, 2016 - August 17, 2019)
Vice World of Sports (April 27, 2016 - April 12, 2017)
Huang's World (April 28, 2016 - August 30, 2017)
King of the Road (April 28, 2016 - September 11, 2018)
Woman with Gloria Steinem (May 10 – June 28, 2016)
Black Market with Michael K. Williams (July 5, 2016 - 2020)
Cyberwar (July 5, 2016 - November 21, 2017)
Vice Does America (July 6 – August 17, 2016)
Dead Set on Life (July 7, 2016 - June 1, 2017)
Party Legends (July 7, 2016 - July 27, 2017)
Black Market: Dispatches (August 16 – October 18, 2016)
Abandoned (September 2 – November 4, 2016)
Desus & Mero (October 17, 2016 - June 28, 2018)
Hamilton's Pharmacopeia (October 26, 2016 – February 8, 2021)
Payday (November 11 – December 30, 2016)
Big Night Out (December 12, 2016 - January 2, 2017)
Bong Appétit (December 14, 2016 - June 4, 2019)
The Pizza Show (December 29, 2016 - February 15, 2018)
Hate Thy Neighbor (January 23, 2017 - March 27, 2018)
Rise (January 27 – March 10, 2017)
Needles & Pins (February 12 – March 19, 2017)
Tattoo Age (March 17, 2017 - September 5, 2018)
Twiz & Tuck (March 27 – May 1, 2017)
Jungletown (March 28 – May 30, 2017)
The Business of Life (April 23 – July 9, 2017)
Beerland (April 27, 2017 – June 26, 2018)
The Therapist (May 8 – October 3, 2017)
American Boyband (June 8 – July 27, 2017)
Funny How? (July 10–14, 2017)
Nuts + Bolts (August 3 – September 7, 2017)
Last Chance High (August 8, 2017)
What Would Diplo Do? (August 3–31, 2017)
Epicly Later'd (September 6 – October 25, 2017)
The Untitled Action Bronson Show (October 23, 2017 – February 15, 2018)
Most Expensivest (November 15, 2017 - July 13, 2020)
The Trixie & Katya Show (November 15, 2017 – March 28, 2018)
The Wrestlers (January 2 – March 16, 2018)
Slutever (January 24, 2018 - March 31, 2019)
The Ice Cream Show (April 24 – June 26, 2018)
Hollywood Love Story (July 11 – August 22, 2018)
Mister Tachyon (July 11 – August 29, 2018)
My House (April 25, 2018 – June 27, 2018)
Dopesick Nation (September 12 – November 14, 2018)
The Hunt for the Trump Tapes with Tom Arnold (September 18 – October 16, 2018)
Kentucky Ayahuasca (November 28, 2018 - January 29, 2019)
Hunting ISIS (2018)
Vice Live (February 25 – April 11, 2019)
Jasper & Errol's First Time (June 11 – August 13, 2019)
Danny's House (July 17 – September 4, 2019)
Terror (August 27, 2019)
How To Rob A Bank (September 12 – October 24, 2019)
The Impeachment Show (November 7–21, 2019)
Donkmaster (2019)
One Star Reviews (April 1 – June 10, 2020)
Shelter in Place with Shane Smith (April 9–30, 2020)
Seat at the Table with Anand Giridharadas (April 22 – July 14, 2020)
No Mercy, No Malice With Professor Scott Galloway (May 7 – June 18, 2020)
Cari & Jemele (Won't) Stick to Sports (August 19, 2020 - February 4, 2021)
Fringe Nation (October 5–26, 2020)
Wet Markets Exposed (October 27 – November 17, 2020)
QAnon: The Search for Q (January 26, 2021 – September 14, 2022)
Counter Space (November 26, 2020 - March 13, 2021)
Kings of Kush (March 9 – May 20, 2021)
I, Sniper (May 10 – June 28, 2021)
Fanatics: The Deep End (May 11 – June 24, 2021)
Unknown Amazon with Pedro Andrade (July 13 – August 17, 2021)
Make Taste Happen (July 19 – August 16, 2021)

Acquired programming
People Just Do Nothing (2017-2019)
Trapped (2017–2018)
It's Always Sunny in Philadelphia (2017–2021)
Blade (2018)
X-Men (2018)
Spider-Man: The New Animated Series (2018)
Iron Man (2018)
Wolverine (2018)
UFO Hunters (2019-2020)
Shockwave (2019-2020)
Wahlburgers (2019-2020)
How the States Got Their Shapes (2019-2020)
Mega Disasters (2019-2020)
Stan Lee's Superhumans (2019-2020)
MonsterQuest (2019-2020)
The Universe (2019-2020)
Bad Ink (2019-2020)
Hell's Angels: Ride or Die (2019-2020)
Cults and Extreme Belief (2019-2020)

International

Canadian-exclusive programming
Cut-Off (June 19, 2016)
Fubar Age of Computer (2017)
Vice Canada Reports (2016)
Nirvanna the Band the Show (February 2, 2017 - February 9, 2018) (Moved to CBC; 2nd season never broadcast in the U.S.)

UK-exclusive programming
Archer (May 1, 2017)
Son of Zorn (June 12, 2017)
Cowboy Bebop (July 17, 2017)
Eureka Seven (July 31, 2017)
Tokyo Ghoul (August 3, 2017)
Tokyo Ghoul √A (August 11, 2017)
Samurai Champloo (August 22, 2017)
Kill la Kill (October 16, 2017)
Durarara!! (November 19, 2017)
Gurren Lagann (January 9, 2018)
Seraph of the End (February 14, 2018)
Black Butler: Book of Shadows (August 8, 2018)
Full Metal Panic! (October 8, 2018)
Wolf's Rain (March 11, 2019)

References

.
Viceland
Anime television
Vice Media